The 1991 UCI Road World Cup was the third edition of the UCI Road World Cup. From the 1990 edition, the same events were retained, with the individual time trial finale event this year in Bergamo, Italy, ran as both the Grand Prix des Nations and the Trofeo Baracchi.

Races

Note: the finale event ran as both the Grand Prix des Nations and the Trofeo Baracchi

Final standings

Riders

Teams

References
 Complete results from Cyclingbase.com 
 Final classification for individuals and teams from memoire-du-cyclisme.net

 
 
UCI Road World Cup (men)